Interstellar is a 2014 epic science fiction film directed by Christopher Nolan. A co-production between the United States and the United Kingdom, Nolan wrote the screenplay with his brother Jonathan and produced it with wife Emma Thomas. The film follows a group of astronauts who travel through a wormhole near Saturn in search of a new home for mankind. It stars Matthew McConaughey, Anne Hathaway, Jessica Chastain, Bill Irwin, Ellen Burstyn, John Lithgow, Michael Caine, Casey Affleck, and Matt Damon. It was released to generally positive reviews for its screenplay, direction, themes, visual effects, musical score, emotional depth, acting, and ambition. Filmgoers also loved the film, with those polled by CinemaScore giving it an average grade of B+ on an A+ to F scale.

Interstellar was awarded numerous accolades, including an Academy Award, ASCAP Film and Television Music Award, British Academy Film Award, Critics' Choice Movie Award, and Visual Effects Society Award among others. It also received multiple Awards Circuit Community Awards, Empire Awards, and Saturn Awards. The film won various awards for best film, and Nolan received various nominations for his directorial role. Cinematographer Hoyte van Hoytema won second place in the 2014 Dallas–Fort Worth Film Critics Association Award for Best Cinematography, and Nathan Crowley (production designer) was listed as the runner-up of the 2014 Best Art Direction/Production Design of the Florida Film Critics Circle, alongside Gary Fettis (set decorator). The cast of the film, namely McConaughey, Hathaway, and Chastain, also received accolades for their acting.

List

Notes

References

External links
 

Interstellar